A paramilitary is an organization whose structure, tactics, training, subculture, and (often) function are similar to those of a professional military, but is not part of a country's official or legitimate armed forces. Paramilitary units carry out duties that a country's military or police forces are unable or unwilling to handle. Other organizations may be considered paramilitaries by structure alone, despite being unarmed or lacking a combat role.

Overview 
Though a paramilitary is, by definition, not a military, it is usually equivalent to a light infantry or special operations forces in terms of strength, firepower, and organizational structure. Paramilitaries use "military" equipment (such as long guns and armored personnel carriers; usually military surplus resources), skills (such as battlefield medicine and bomb disposal), and tactics (such as urban warfare and close-quarters combat) that are compatible with their purpose, often combining them with skills from other relevant fields such as law enforcement or search and rescue. They rarely use extensive military equipment such as artillery and armed military aircraft. 

In peacetime, paramilitaries are often assigned to protect high-profile sites, such as government facilities, infrastructure, airports, seaports, or borders. They may also be tasked with roles of VIP protection or counterterrorism. Depending on the organization the paramilitary operates under, they may also be reassigned until they are needed again; for example, members of a police tactical unit may be assigned to standard patrol duties until requested.

A paramilitary may fall under the command of a military, train alongside them, or have permission to use their resources, despite not actually being part of them. In some instances, paramilitaries may train members of an actual military in tactics they specialize in, such as arrest procedures.

Legality 
Under the law of war, a state may incorporate a paramilitary organization or armed agency (such as a law enforcement agency or a private volunteer militia) into its combatant armed forces. The other parties to a conflict have to be notified thereof.

Some countries' constitutions limit freedom of association by prohibiting paramilitary organizations outside government use. In most cases, there is no definition of paramilitary, and court decisions are responsible for defining that concept.

Types 

Depending on the definition adopted, "paramilitaries" may include:

Military organizations 
 The auxiliary forces of a state's military or government, such as national guard, presidential guard, republican guard, state defense force, home guard, civil guard, and royal guard forces
 Private military company and mercenary forces
 Irregular military forces, such as militias, militants, partisans, resistance movements, freedom fighters, rebel groups, guerrillas, insurgents, and terrorists

Law enforcement 

 Semi-militarized law enforcement units within civilian special police forces, such as police tactical units, SWAT, Emergency Service Units, and incident response teams
 Local, county, and state law enforcement agencies, such as local police, marshals, county sheriffs, constables, park rangers, and state patrol
 Military police, such as Naval police, and Air police
 Gendarmeries, such as the Dutch Royal Marechaussee, Egyptian Central Security Forces, European EUROGENDFOR, Turkic TAKM, and Chilean Carabineros de Chile
 Border guards, such as the Australian Border Force, Indian Border Security Force, Bangladeshi Border Guards Bangladesh, and Turkish village guards
 Customs
 Coast guards such a Water police
 Security forces of ambiguous military status, such as internal troops, railroad guards, or railway troops
 Branches of intelligence agency tasked with law enforcement or security operations:
 CIA Special Activities Center Special Operations Group and Global Response Staff
 Tactical federal agency branches of the American FBI, DEA, ATF, and ICE, among other Feds and Federales
 Federal Protective Forces
 NASA Emergency Response Teams

Civil defense 
 Fire departments in many countries are often organized like paramilitaries despite being unarmed
 Belgian Civil Protection
 Singapore Civil Defence Force
 Australian State Emergency Service
 Ukrainian Territorial Defense Forces
 Lithuanian Riflemen's Union

Political 
 Armed, semi-militarized wings of existing political parties:
 the Italian Fascist Party's Voluntary Militia for National Security
 Weimar paramilitary groups, belonging to political parties in the Weimar Republic:
 the Nazi Party's NSFK, NSKK, Sturmabteilung and Schutzstaffel
 the Monarchist German National People's Party's Der Stahlhelm
 the Communist Party of Germany's Parteiselbstschutz
 Northern Irish paramilitary groups during the Troubles
 Sinn Féin's Irish Republican Army 
 DUP's Ulster Volunteer Force
 Hamas' Izz ad-Din al-Qassam Brigades
 African National Congress' UMkhonto we Sizwe

Examples of paramilitary units

See also 

 :Category:Rebel militia groups
 International Association of Gendarmeries and Police Forces with Military Status
 List of Serbian paramilitary formations
 Militarization of police
 Fourth-generation warfare
 Violent non-state actor
 Military urbanism
 Private army
 Guerrilla warfare
 List of countries by number of military and paramilitary personnel
 List of paramilitary organizations

References

Further reading 
 Golkar, Saeid. (2012) Paramilitarization of the Economy: the Case of Iran's Basij Militia, Armed Forces & Society, Vol. 38, No. 4
 Golkar, Saeid. (2012). Organization of the Oppressed or Organization for Oppressing: Analysing the Role of the Basij Militia of Iran. Politics, Religion & Ideology, Dec., 37–41. doi:10.1080/21567689.2012.725661

External links 

 Global Security

Civil–military relations
 
 
Military terminology
Private security industry